Bo is a mainly Swedish/Danish masculine given name, derived from the Old Norse verb búa ("to reside"). A variant of Bo is the Swedish Bosse.  Bo is uncommon as a surname. Bo is also short for names including Beaufort, Beauregard, Bonita, or Bonnie; it is also a less common shortening of the name Robert, which is usually shortened to Bob. It can also be a shortening of the name James, which is usually shortened to Jimmy, Jim, or Jimbo.

Notable people

Given name
 Bo Anderson, birth name of American Brazilian DJ and producer Maga Bo
Bo Bergman (1869–1967), Swedish poet
Bo van Leijden (1998), Dutch Scrahole
Bo Bichette (born 1998), Major League Baseball player
Bo Boustedt (1868–1939), Swedish Army Lieutenant General
Bo Bowling (born 1987), American football player
Bo Carpelan (1926–2011), Finnish poet and author
Bo Danske, 13th-century Danish philosopher
Bo Ericson (athlete) (1919–1970), Swedish hammer thrower
Bo Goldman (born 1932), American writer, Broadway playwright, and screenwriter
Bo Hamburger (born 1970), Danish former cyclist
Bo Hansson (1943–2010), Swedish musician
Bo Holmberg (1942–2010), Swedish politician
Bo Horvat (1995), Current Captain of the Vancouver Canucks of the National Hockey League
Bo Johansson (born 1942), Swedish former football player and current football coach
Bo Larsson (born 1944), former Swedish football midfielder/striker
Bo Ljungberg (1911–1984), Swedish pole vaulter
Bo Melton (born 1999), American football player
Bo Levi Mitchell (born 1990), Canadian football quarterback
Bo Mossberg, Swedish author and illustrator of Den nya nordiska floran
Bo Nix (born 2000), American football quarterback
Bo Persson (table tennis), former Swedish table tennis player
Bo Petersson, (born 1946), Swedish football manager and former football player
Bo Randall, (1909 – 1989), American knifemaker
Bo Johan Renck, (born 1966), Swedish director of music videos, TV and film
Bo Rybeck (1935–2019), Swedish physician
Bo Scarbrough (born 1996), American football player
Bo Svenson (born 1941), Swedish-born American actor
Bo Svensson (born 1979), Danish football player
Bo Toresson (born 1939), Swedish politician
Bo Varenius (1918–1996), Swedish major general
Bo Vestergaard (born 1965), Danish lightweight rower
Bo Widerberg (1930–1997), Swedish film director

Nickname
 Bo Belinsky (1936–2001), American Major League Baseball pitcher
 Bo Bice (born 1975), American singer who placed second on the fourth season of American Idol
 Bo Bruce (born 25 November 1984), English singer-songwriter
 Gudmundur S. (Bo) Bodvarsson (1952–2006), Icelandic hydrogeologist
 Bo Bolinger (1932–2011), American football player
 Jérôme Napoléon Bonaparte (1805–1870), American farmer, son of Napoleon Bonaparte's brother Jérôme and Elizabeth Patterson
 Bo Brown (1906–1996), American cartoonist
 Bo Burnham (born 1990), American singer songwriter/comedian
 Bo Burris (born 1944), American retired National Football League player
 Bo Callaway (April 2, 1927 – March 15, 2014), American politician and businessman
 Bo Cornell (born 1949), American retired National Football League player
 Israel "Bo" Curtis (1932-2012), African-American educator and politician
 Bo Derek (born 1956), American actress
 Bo Diddley (1928–2008), American R&B and Chicago blues musician
 Bo Goldman (born September 10, 1932), American writer, Broadway playwright, and screenwriter
 Bo Gritz (born January 18, 1939), American former US Army officer and perennial candidate
 Bo Halldórsson (born 16 April 1951), Icelandic pop singer
 Bo Hines (born 1995), American football player and politician
 Bo Hopkins (born 1942), American actor
 Bo Horvat (born 1995), Canadian hockey player
 Bo Jackson (born 1962), American former National Football League and Major League Baseball player
 Bo Kimble (born 1966), American basketball player
 Bo Lamar (born 1951), American former basketball player
 Bo McCalebb (born May 4, 1985), American-Macedonian professional basketball player
 Bo Mitchell (born September 5, 1970), representative in the Tennessee House of Representatives
 Bo Outlaw (born 1971), American former National Basketball Association player
 Bo Pelini (born 1967), American college football head coach
 Bo Rein (July 20, 1945 – January 10, 1980), American, football player, baseball player, and football coach
 Bo Roberson (July 23, 1935 – April 15, 2001), American, track and field athlete, and football player
 Bo Robinson (born 1956), American retired National Football League player
 Bo Ryan (born 1947), American college basketball coach and former player
 Bo Schembechler (1929–2006), American football player, college head coach and administrator
 Bo Snerdley, pseudonym of James Golden (radio personality)
 Bo Songvisava (born 1979/1980), Thai chef
 Bo Welch (born November 30, 1951), American production designer, art director, film and TV director, actor

Fictional characters
Bo Adams, main character in the Believe TV series
Bo Abobo from the video game Double Dragon
Bo, a character from the video game Brawl Stars
Bo Brady, in the soap opera Days of Our Lives
Bo Buchanan, in the soap opera One Life to Live
Bo Callahan, main draft prospect in the movie Draft Day
Bo Cocky, the main protagonist in the 2006 film Supertwink
Bo (Lost Girl) (Bo Dennis), protagonist of the Canadian TV series Lost Girl
Bo Duke, one of the main characters in The Dukes of Hazzard TV series
Bo Monkey, a main character in the Nickelodeon TV series Fresh Beat Band of Spies
Bo Orlov, a character in the Netflix series Grand Army
Little Bo Peep, from a nursery rhyme
Bo Peep, in the Toy Story animated film
Bo' Rai Cho, in the Mortal Kombat video game series
Bo Sheep, in the U.S. Acres comic strip
Bo Sinclair, in the 2005 film House of WaxBo, a cheetah from the British animated TV series Mama Mirabelle's Home MoviesBo, a cartoon character in Muse magazine
Bo, an orphan named "Boniface" in the Cornelia Funke novel The Thief LordBo, the main protagonist of the 2017 animated film The Star''
Bo Hess from the movie Signs

See also 
 Beau (name), given name and surname

References

Danish masculine given names
Swedish masculine given names
English masculine given names
Lists of people by nickname